The 1999 FIVB World Grand Prix was the seventh women's volleyball tournament of its kind. It was held over three weeks in four cities throughout Asia, cumulating with the final round in Yu Xi, PR China, from 27 to 29 August 1999.

Teams

Preliminary rounds

Ranking
The best four teams from the overall ranking are qualified for the final round.

|}

First round

Group A
Venue: Macau

|}

Group B
Venue: Genting, Malaysia

|}

Second round

Group C
Venue: Kaohsiung, Taiwan

|}

Group D
Venue: Manila, Philippines

|}

Final round
Venue: Yuxi, China

Final four

Semifinals

|}

3rd place match

|}

Final

|}

Final ranking

Individual awards

Most Valuable Player:

Best Scorer:

Best Spiker:

Best Blocker:

Best Server:

Best Digger:

Best Setter:

Best Receiver:

Dream Team

Setter:

Middle Blockers:

Outside Hitters:

Opposite Hitter:

References
Volleyball Almanac

FIVB World Grand Prix
1999 in Chinese sport
International volleyball competitions hosted by China
1999